The year 1982 was the 11th year after the independence of Bangladesh. It was also the first year of the Government of Hussain Muhammad Ershad.

Incumbents

 President:
 until 24 March: Abdus Sattar
 24 – 27 March: Hussain Muhammad Ershad
 starting 27 March: A. F. M. Ahsanuddin Chowdhury
 Prime Minister: Shah Azizur Rahman (until 24 March)
 Chief Justice: Kemaluddin Hossain (until 12 April), F.K.M. Munim (starting 12 April)

Demography

Climate

Economy

Note: For the year 1982 average official exchange rate for BDT was 22.12 per US$.

Events
 24 March - Lt. Gen. Hussain Muhammad Ershad assumes power through a bloodless coup.
 26 June - Bangladesh adopts standards of weights and measures based on metric system.
 4 October - Bangladesh signs with India a memorandum of understanding on water sharing for two years.
 Bangladesh enacted the National Drug Policy which helped develop the drug manufacturing industry in Bangladesh.
 The Upazila Parishad law known as the Local Government (Thana Parishad and Thana Reorganization) Ordinance 1982 provided for a directly elected chairman based on one man one vote principle. The local level government functionaries were made non-voting members while the elected union parishad chairmen became members with voting rights.

Awards and Recognitions

Independence Day Award

Ekushey Padak
 Syed Ali Ahsan (literature)
 Abul Hasan (literature)
 Talim Hossain (literature)
 Abdul Hakim (education)
 Ful Mohammad (music)
 SM Sultan (fine arts)
 G A Mannan (literature)
 Sanaullah Nuri (journalism)

Sports
 Domestic football:
 Mohammedan SC won Dhaka League title while Abahani KC became runner-up.
 Mohammedan SC and Abahani KC jointly won the title of Bangladesh Federation Cup.

Births
 2 June – Topu, singer
 15 June–  Abdur Razzak, cricketer
 27 October–  Wasfia Nazreen, mountaineer and activist
 25 December –  Tapash Baisya, cricketer

Deaths
 16 February – Enamul Haque, writer (b. 1902)
 27 March – Fazlur Rahman Khan, structural engineer and architect (b. 1929)
 5 May – Phuljhuri Khan, instrumentalist (b. 1920)

See also 
 1980s in Bangladesh
 Timeline of Bangladeshi history

References